The Lame Dog Man (1967) is a novel by Australian author George Turner. It is the last in the author's "Treelake" series, following The Cupboard Under the Stairs and A Waste of Shame.

Plot outline
The title character is Jimmy Carlvon, a young man employed as a Commonwealth employment officer. Carlvon moves among a group of psychologically disturbed people, attempting to rectify problems in others' lives while being totally unable to do anything about this own.

Critical reception
Reviewing the novel in The Age Neil Jillet noted that with this novel "George Turner ends his Treelake (Wangraratta ?) trilogy, one of the more quietly impressive achievements of Australian postwar literature." He did, however, have some reservations: "if the flesh of this novel is rather weak, its bones are in first-class order. Mr. Turner knows how Australians think and act, even though he has forgotten how they speak."

Notes
Dedication: "The last of the Treelake stories is for Skeet and Edna, who were there for the first one."

Epigraph: 
'Far other aims his heart had learned to prize, / More skilled to raise the wretched than to rise. / His house was known to all the vagrant train; / He chid their wanderings but relieved their pain.'

'This same philosophy is a good horse in the stable, but an arrant jade on a journey.'

Oliver Goldsmith, The Deserted Village and The Good-Natured Man

See also
 1967 in Australian literature

References

1967 Australian novels